Gabriel Hernández Romero (July 13, 1973 – June 25, 2001) was a male boxer from the Dominican Republic, who competed for his native country at the 1996 Summer Olympics in Atlanta, Georgia. There he was stopped in the first round of the men's light heavyweight division by South Africa's Sybrand Botes (11-16).

A bronze medal winner at the 1995 Pan American Games Hernández made his professional debut on November 15, 1996 defeating Shawn Cornell by knock-out in the first round. He committed suicide by hanging, aged 27, nine days after his last bout against Ralph Monday.

References

External links
 

1973 births
2001 suicides
Light-heavyweight boxers
Boxers at the 1995 Pan American Games
Boxers at the 1996 Summer Olympics
Olympic boxers of the Dominican Republic
People from La Romana, Dominican Republic
Suicides by hanging in New York (state)
Dominican Republic male boxers
Pan American Games bronze medalists for the Dominican Republic
Pan American Games medalists in boxing
Medalists at the 1995 Pan American Games